Richard the Stork (Released in North America as A Stork's Journey, German: Überflieger — Kleine Vögel, großes Geklapper and also known as Little Bird's Big Adventure) is a 2017 computer-animated adventure film. Richard the Stork premiered at the Berlin International Film Festival in Germany on February 12, 2017. Animated movie was released for a limited time on Google Play on June 1, 2017. It premiered in theaters in the United States on June 30, 2017.

A sequel Richard the Stork 2 will be released in 2023.

Plot 
Richard, an orphaned sparrow, is adopted and raised by a group of storks. But when they leave on their annual migration south for the winter, Richard, a little non-migrating bird, endeavors to embark on the long arduous journey to stay with his stork family that must reveal his true identity and leave him behind in the forest, since he would not survive the journey to Africa. Determined to prove he is a stork after all, Richard ventures south on his own, joined by an eccentric pygmy owl named Olga with an imaginary friend named Oleg and a narcissistic, disco-singing budgerigar named Kiki. Along their epic journey, they run into many obstacles, like deadly bats, internet-addicted pigeons, mafia crows and a thundering jumbo jet. When they finally find their way to Africa, it's up to Richard to rescue his stork brother Max from the clutches of a monstrous honey badger. The tiniest stork must learn to see himself as the greatest sparrow to unleash his true potential and be reunited with his family.

Cast
 Cooper Kramer (original dub) and Drake Bell (Lionsgate dub) as Richard, an orphan tween house sparrow main protagonist,
 Shannon Conley (original dub) and Jane Lynch (Lionsgate dub) as Olga, a pygmy owl that was disliked by her family because of her large size.
 Marc Thompson as Kiki, a budgerigar who lives in an karaoke bar
 Erica Schroeder as Aurora, a female white stork, the adoptive mother of Richard.
 Jonathan Todd Ross as Claudius, a male white stork, Max's father
 Jason Griffith as Max, a young white stork, Claudius's son
 Michele Knotz (original dub) and Justine Ezarik (Lionsgate dub) as Social Media Pigeons

Production 
Studio Rakete in Hamburg, Germany and Studio 352 in Luxembourg created the storyboard. Studio Rakete was also responsible for the design of the main characters; Studio 352 designed the supporting characters. Most of the character animation was done by Bug AS in Norway. Lighting/shading, FX simulations and compositing of the final pictures was done by Walking the Dog from Belgium and Rise FX in Berlin. The movie was animated and rendered using Houdini with over 500 shots to be finished.

References

External links 

Ulysses Filmproduktion

2017 films
Belgian animated films
Belgian children's films
English-language German films
English-language Belgian films
English-language Luxembourgian films
German animated films
German children's films
Luxembourgian animated films
Norwegian animated films
Norwegian children's films
Animated films about birds
Animated films about orphans
Films about owls
Fictional storks
Films about badgers
2010s children's films
Films directed by Toby Genkel
2010s English-language films
2010s German films